The 2015 Qatar Total Open was a professional women's tennis tournament played on hard courts. It was the 13th edition of the event and part of the WTA Premier series of the 2015 WTA Tour. It took place at the International Tennis and Squash Complex in Doha, Qatar from 23 February to 28 February. Lucie Šafářová won the title, defeating Victoria Azarenka in the final, 6–4, 6–3. Simona Halep was the defending champion, but withdrew before the tournament began.

Seeds
The top four seeds received a bye into the second round.

Draw

Finals

Top half

Bottom half

Qualifying

Seeds

Qualifiers

Lucky loser
  Zheng Saisai

Draw

First qualifier

Second qualifier

Third qualifier

Fourth qualifier

References
Main Draw in WebArchive
Qualifying Draw in WebArchive

Qatar Total Open - Singles
Qatar Ladies Open
2015 in Qatari sport